Barrie Hansen (born August 11, 1941) was a Canadian football defensive back and occasional punt returner who played for the Hamilton Tiger-Cats, Montreal Alouettes, Winnipeg Blue Bombers, and BC Lions.

Hansen played college football at the California State University, Northridge. He joined the Alouettes in 1961 and played 3 years with them. He next played 3 more years with Winnipeg, missing only 3 games. He then played 3 more years with Hamilton from 1967 to 1969, where he won the 1967 Grey Cup. The following year, he reached a peak with 5 interceptions. His final year was at BC.

He died February 5, 2017, in Ventura California.

References

1941 births
Living people
BC Lions players
Cal State Northridge Matadors football players
Canadian football defensive backs
Canadian football running backs
Hamilton Tiger Cubs players
Montreal Alouettes players
Players of Canadian football from Manitoba
Canadian football people from Winnipeg
Winnipeg Blue Bombers players